Blue and Not So Pink (released in the U.S. as My Straight Son) is a Venezuelan drama film written and directed by Miguel Ferrari and released in November 2012.

The film won the Goya Award for Best Spanish Language Foreign Film at the 28th Goya Awards in 2014, the first Venezuelan film to do so.

The film deals with controversial issues in Venezuelan society: homophobic violence, homosexuality, transsexualism and domestic violence. The film had its U.S. premiere on 25 June 2014 at the Frameline Film Festival.

Plot 
Diego is a photographer living in Caracas. In the opening scene, he photographs a performance choreographed by his friend Delirio del Río, who is a transgender woman. Diego meets his partner Fabrizio in a restaurant, and they kiss. Diego's employee Perla Marina turns up late to work, making excuses to hide the domestic violence inflicted on her by her partner Iván. Diego has lunch with his family, where they display homophobic opinions, which are also seen in the TV programme hosted by Estrellita.

Diego's son Armando returns to Caracas to live with Diego, after spending five years in Madrid with his mother. Their relationship is strained at first. Armando lacks confidence in his appearance. Shortly after Armando's arrival, Diego's partner Fabrizio is the victim of a homophobic attack by a gang led by Rasco, outside the Club 69 where Delirio is performing. Diego tries unsuccessfully to get Rasco arrested. In the aftermath of the attack, Diego, Armando, Delirio and Perla Marina come together. The four practice tango together to help Armando impress Laura, a girl he has met on the internet. After Fabrizio dies, Armando joins Diego to stand up to Rasco and his gang. They are attacked by the gang, but Delirio, in full stage make-up and high heels, scares the gang off with a warning shot.

Diego, Armando, Delirio and Perla Marina take a road trip to Mérida to plant a tree for Fabrizio and for Armando to meet Laura at a tango dance. Perla Marina admits she is pregnant. On returning home, she finally stands up to Iván and decides to raise the baby alone. At the end of the film, a dancer at the club reveals he filmed the attack on Fabrizio on his phone. Rasgo is arrested. Diego becomes closer to his family, who accept his homosexuality. Armando returns to Madrid much more confident. Estrellita's TV show is replaced by 'Noches de Delirio'. Delirio delivers a monologue urging acceptance of difference.

Cast
 Guillermo García as Diego
 Nacho Montes (aka Ignacio Montes González) as Armando
 Hilda Abrahamz as Delirio del Río
 Carolina Torres as Perla Marina
 Alexander Da Silva as Racso
 Sócrates Serrano as Fabrizio
 Elba Escobar as Rocío
 Beatriz Valdés as Estrellita
 Jose Roberto Diaz as Doctor
 Aroldo Betancourt  as TBA

References

External links
 
 Blue and Not So Pink at Cine Mestizo
 Official Website (in English)
 Film's page at TLA Releasing
 

2012 films
2010s Spanish-language films
Best Foreign Film in the Spanish Language Goya Award Winners
Venezuelan LGBT-related films
2012 LGBT-related films